Brookula conica is a species of sea snail, a marine gastropod mollusk, unassigned in the superfamily Seguenzioidea.

Description
The height of the shell attains 1.8 mm.

Distribution
This species occurs in the Atlantic Ocean off Brazil.

References

External links
 To Encyclopedia of Life
 To World Register of Marine Species

conica
Gastropods described in 1886